Anatolie Ghilaş (born 23 January 1957) is a Moldovan politician who has been a member of the Parliament of Moldova between 2009 and 2011.

External links 
 Site-ul Parlamentului Republicii Moldova
 Partidul Democrat din Moldova

References

1957 births
Living people
Moldovan MPs 2009–2010
Democratic Party of Moldova MPs

Recipients of the Order of Honour (Moldova)